So Far Gone may refer to:
So Far Gone (mixtape), Drake album
So Far Gone (EP), Drake EP
"So Far Gone" (song), James Blunt song
"So Far Gone", Moby song from 18 B Sides + DVD
"So Far Gone", The Early Years song